Łukasz Sówka (born 7 November 1993) is a former speedway rider from Poland.

Speedway career
He rode in the top tier of British Speedway for the Wolverhampton Wolves during the 2012 Elite League speedway season. He last raced in 2017 for Ostrovia Ostrów in Poland.

References 

1993 births
Living people
Polish speedway riders
Wolverhampton Wolves riders